The Hazara Expedition of 1888, also known as the Black Mountain Expedition or the First Hazara Expedition, was a military campaign by the British against the tribes of Kala Dhaka (then known as the Black Mountains of Hazara) in the Hazara region of what is now Pakistan.

On 18 June 1888, two British officers and four Gurkha soldiers were killed in an altercation between British reconnaissance patrols and antagonistic tribes. As a response, the Hazara Field Force was assembled and began its march on 4 October 1888, after an ultimatum had not been satisfied by the tribes by October 2, 1888. The first phase of the campaign ended with the Hassanzai and Akazai tribes requesting an armistice on October 19, 1888. The second phase of the campaign targeted the tribes that lived north of Black Mountain such as the Allaiwals. The campaign ended when the Allaiwal village of Pokal was occupied and destroyed by the British on November 2 and 3, 1888.

The then Commander in Chief in India General Sir Frederick Roberts viewed the Black Mountain Expedition as:
a success from a military point of view, but … the determination of the Punjab Government to limit the sphere of action of the troops, and to hurry out of the country, prevented our reaping any political advantage. We lost a grand opportunity for gaining control over this lawless and troublesome district; no survey was made, no roads opened out, the tribesmen were not made to feel our power, and, consequently, very soon another costly expedition had to be undertaken.

1891 expedition
The failure of the tribes to honour the agreements that ended the 1888 campaign led to a further two-month expedition by a Hazara Field Force in 1891. General Roberts observed that  the Black Mountain tribes, [having been] quite unsubdued by the fruitless expedition of 1888, had given trouble almost immediately afterwards. [The second expedition] was completely successful in political results as in its military conduct. The columns were not withdrawn until the tribesmen had become convinced that they were powerless to sustain a hostile attitude towards us, and that it was in their interest, as it was our wish, that they should henceforth be on amicable terms with us.

British and Indian Army forces who took part in these expeditions received the India General Service Medal with the clasps Hazara 1888 and Hazara 1891 respectively.

References

Battles involving British India
Expeditionary units and formations
Military history of Khyber Pakhtunkhwa
1888 in India
Conflicts in 1888
Punitive expeditions